Young Memorial Church, also known as Brier Hill Congregational Church, is a historic Congregational church in the hamlet of Brier Hill in Morristown, St. Lawrence County, New York.  It was built in 1907–1908, and is a one-story, stone and wood shingled church building in the Arts and Crafts style.  It features a steeply pitched gable roof, tall stone chimney, opaque art glass windows by Harry James Horwood, and central two-story square tower with a crenelated top.

The church building housed a Congregational church until the 1950s. Subsequently, it was used by a Baptist congregation until 1985. As of 2010, it had not been used since the Baptist group left.

It was listed on the National Register of Historic Places in 2010.

References

External links

Former churches in New York (state)
Churches on the National Register of Historic Places in New York (state)
Churches completed in 1908
Congregational churches in New York (state)
Churches in St. Lawrence County, New York
National Register of Historic Places in St. Lawrence County, New York
1908 establishments in New York (state)